The Dazhou gas field is a natural gas field located in Sichuan. It was discovered in 2005 and developed by the China National Petroleum Corporation. It began production in 2006 and produces natural gas and condensates. The total proven reserves of the Dazhou gas field are around 134.9 trillion cubic feet (3800 km³), and production is slated to be around 1.9 billion cubic feet/day (54.8×105m³).

References

Natural gas fields in China